Stage 4 may refer to:

 Key Stage 4
 Stage 4 of Everywhere at the End of Time
 Cambrian Stage 4
 Stage 4 cancer
 Stage 4 CKD
 Dual-Stage 4-Grid
 Stage 4 of Braak staging
 Decomposition stage 4
 Whale fall stage 4
 2019–20 Biathlon World Cup – Stage 4
 2021 Call of Duty League season stage 4

See also 
 Piaget's 4 stages of cognitive development